Three Men in a Boat (German: Drei Mann in einem Boot) is a 1961 Austrian-West German comedy film directed by Helmut Weiss and starring Walter Giller, Heinz Erhardt, Hans-Joachim Kulenkampff and Susanne Cramer. The film is based on the 1889 British novel Three Men in a Boat by Jerome K. Jerome. It was shot at the Rosenhügel Studios in Vienna and on location in Amsterdam and along the River Rhine through the Rhineland region and Baden-Württemberg of Germany and Switzerland. The film's sets were designed by the veteran art director Willi Herrmann.

Plot 
The advertisement salesmen Harry Berg und Jerome, named "Jo", Sommer are on holiday at the Bodensee alone. Jo is trying to catch the young girl Grit and Harry wants to get rid of his intrusive girlfriend Julitschka. When she suddenly appears, Harry and Jo are trying to buy a boat to drive away. They also find a dog and call him "Sputnik".

Also the art salesman Georg Nolte is trying to have holiday but his wife Carlotta and his daughter Grit are not allowing him it. In a bar he's listening to Harry's and Jo's talk about the boat and asks them to join them, he offers himself as a cook. Both agree and the three of them are calling the trip "Three Men on a boat, not to forget about the dog", in reference to a well-known book. They also call the boat "Marianne".

When the wives discover the missing of their husbands they are trying to follow them. Julitschka even is hiring a Swiss detective Georg offers to travel over the Rhine, so he can be at an auction in Amsterdam to buy a painting by Renoire and sell one by Brueghel. On the boat Georg and Harry are named Captains (Georg claimed that he was on a battleship, however he told later that he was only a visitor) and Jo the first maid. But things change after they have an accident at the Rheinfall, where Georg doesn't noticed it, so he becomes the first maid instead of Jo. Later they have another accident with another ship, where one of the crew, the maid Betje is falling over board and is saved by the three men from the "Marianne".

During the travel they also stop in Königswinter, where Georg finds his daughter and he realized that Jo was after her, but he allows him. He hasn't seen his wife and tells her over the phone to wait in Amsterdam. Meanwhile, Harry is trying to catch his luck with Betje.

In Amsterdam Harry and Jo go to the auction but Georg is late, because he's stopping the boat at a place for carriage boats. When he comes to the auction he's told that the Renoire is sold very cheap to a young guy. Apparently Jo accidentally bought the painting, because he didn't know the hand-raise-rule of the auction. Harry told Georg about it in the way, that Jo did a great bluff. Georg is impressed with Jo and at the end everybody is happy.

At the end Julitschka doesn't want Harry any more and starts dating the detective. Meanwhile, Harry and Georg are on the boat with Betje and Carlotta, while the boat is tied by a rope to a car with Jo and Grit inside. At the end Jo said, "Would be good to get rid of them", not noticing that the rope got ripped. The movie ends with that scene.

Differences from novel 
The location is changed from the Thames to the Rhine River, the story differs substantially and is set to happen in 1960. The main connection to the novel is the basic idea of three friends travelling downriver in a boat and the names are of the characters are similar. The novel itself is also mentioned in a dialog.

Cast 
Walter Giller as Jerome (Jo) Sommer
Heinz Erhardt as Georg Nolte
Hans-Joachim Kulenkampff as Harry Berg
Susanne Cramer as Betje Ackerboom
Ina Duscha as Grit Nolte
Loni Heuser as Carlotta, Grit's Mother
Josef Sieber as Captain Ackerboom
Ida Boros as Julischka (Fee) von Wendorf
Bum Krüger as Melman
Willy Reichert as Mägele
Sepp Rist as Guggemos
Rolf Wanka as Dr. Flüeli
Tobby as Sputnik

Soundtrack 
Like many German movies of that time, this movie features a few original songs, like:
 Drei Mann in einem Boot - sung by Heinz Erhardt, Hans-Joachim Kulenkampff and Walter Giller
 Oh Marianne - sung by Heinz Erhardt, Hans-Joachim Kulenkampff and Walter Giller

References

External links 

1961 films
1961 comedy films
Austrian comedy films
German comedy films
West German films
1960s German-language films
Films based on works by Jerome K. Jerome
Seafaring films
Films directed by Helmut Weiss
Films set in West Germany
Films set in the Netherlands
Films set in Switzerland
Gloria Film films
Films shot at Rosenhügel Studios
1960s German films